Damien Dante Wayans (born April 29, 1980) is an American actor, screenwriter, producer and director. He is a member of the Wayans family.

Early life
Wayans was born in New York City. He is a member of the Wayans family, which includes Keenen Ivory Wayans, Damon Wayans Sr., Kim Wayans, Shawn Wayans, and Marlon Wayans. He is the son of their sibling Elvira Wayans and brother of Chaunté Wayans. Damon Wayans Jr. and Michael Wayans are his cousins.

Career
Damien Dante Wayans began his career in 1987 in Eddie Murphy's concert film Eddie Murphy Raw. He acted with his uncle Damon Wayans in Major Payne. He then went on to writing and directing. His big break in acting was in Jamie Kennedy's film Malibu's Most Wanted when he played the role of Tec, Shondra's (Regina Hall) ex-boyfriend. Damien has written and directed several episodes of his uncle Damon's sitcom My Wife And Kids. In 2006, Damien along with his cousin Craig Wayans wrote and produced on uncle Damon's The Underground, a sketch comedy show on Showtime. Damien also directed a few segments.

He made his directorial debut with the film Dance Flick, which was written by Damien, Keenen, Shawn, Marlon and Craig Wayans.

In 2009, Damien formed a film and TV production company called Second Generation Productions, given their being the second generation of Wayans in the entertainment industry. Damien plans to create, develop and produce multiplatform content.

Filmography

Actor

Writer

Producer

Director

References

External links

African-American male actors
African-American film directors
American male child actors
American male film actors
American male television actors
American film directors
American film producers
American male screenwriters
Living people
Damien Dante
1980 births
20th-century American male actors
21st-century American male actors
20th-century African-American people
21st-century African-American people